Iacob Felecan (1 January 1914 – 1964) was a Romanian footballer  who played for Romania in the 1938 FIFA World Cup. He also played for Victoria Cluj.

References

External links
FIFA profile

1914 births
Romanian footballers
Romania international footballers
Liga I players
Victoria Cluj players
FC Ripensia Timișoara players
1938 FIFA World Cup players
1964 deaths
Association football defenders